Andre Agassi and Petr Korda were the defending champions, but Agassi chose not to participate. Korda played along Ivan Lendl, but lost in the first round to Neil Borwick and Simon Youl.

Ken Flach and Robert Seguso won the title defeating Grant Connell and Glenn Michibata in the finals, 6–7(3–7), 6–4 7–5.

Seeds
The top four seeded teams received byes into the second round.

Draw

Finals

Top half

Bottom half

References

External links
 Cincinnati Draw History Book
 1991 Cincinnati Masters Doubles Draw

Doubles